The A. H. Chapman House at 256 E. 12th St. in Chico, California was built in 1859.  It has also been known as "Little Chapman Mansion".  It was listed on the National Register of Historic Places in 1982.

It corresponds to a published house plan designed by architect Andrew Jackson Downing.  It is likely that it was specifically designed by architect Henry W. Cleaveland, known to be a "disciple" of Downing and known to have been "working in Chico in the 1870s when the house was twice expanded to its present form."

External links

References

Gothic Revival architecture in California
Greek Revival houses in California
Houses completed in 1859
Houses in Butte County, California
Houses on the National Register of Historic Places in California
National Register of Historic Places in Butte County, California